Cargo 200 (Gruz 200) may refer to:

 Cargo 200 (code name), the code word referring to casualties for transportation in the Russian military
 Cargo 200 (film), 2007 Russian thriller film by Aleksei Balabanov

See also
 200rf.com, an Internet project by the Ministry of Internal Affairs of Ukraine